In arithmetic geometry, the  Selmer group, named in honor of the work of  by , is a group constructed from an isogeny of abelian varieties.

The Selmer group of an isogeny

The Selmer group of an abelian variety A with respect to an isogeny f : A → B of abelian varieties can be defined in terms of Galois cohomology as

Geometrically, the principal homogeneous spaces coming from elements of the Selmer group have Kv-rational points for all places v of K. The Selmer group is finite. This implies that the part of the Tate–Shafarevich group killed by f is finite due to the following exact sequence

 0 → B(K)/f(A(K)) → Sel(f)(A/K) → Ш(A/K)[f] → 0.

The Selmer group in the middle of this exact sequence is finite and effectively computable. This implies the weak Mordell–Weil theorem that its subgroup B(K)/f(A(K)) is finite. There is a notorious problem about whether this subgroup  can be effectively computed: there is a procedure for  computing it that will terminate with the correct answer if there is some prime p such that the p-component of  the Tate–Shafarevich group is finite. It is conjectured that the Tate–Shafarevich group is in fact finite, in which case any prime p would work. However, if (as seems unlikely) the Tate–Shafarevich group has an infinite p-component for every prime p, then the procedure may never terminate.

 has generalized the notion of Selmer group to more general p-adic Galois representations and to p-adic variations of motives in the context of Iwasawa theory.

The Selmer group of a finite Galois module

More generally one can define the Selmer group of a finite Galois module M (such as the kernel of an isogeny) as the elements of H1(GK,M) that have images inside certain given subgroups of H1(GKv,M).

References

See also
 Wiles's proof of Fermat's Last Theorem

Number theory